Statistics of the 2005–06 Saudi Premier League.

Stadia and locations

Final league table

Championship playoffs

Match against fourth place

Match against third place

Final

Season statistics

Top scorers

References

External links 
 RSSSF Stats
 Saudi Arabia Football Federation
 Saudi League Statistics

Saudi Premier League seasons
Saudi Professional League
2005–06 in Saudi Arabian football